Sergei Ivanovich Shmatkó (26 September 1966 – 7 November 2021) was a Russian businessman and politician specializing in the energy industry. He was Russia's Minister of Energy from May 2008 until May 2012.

Early life and education
Shmatko was born in Stavropol (South-West of Russia). He earned degrees from both Urals State University in Yekaterinburg (USSR) and the University of Marburg in West Germany.

Business career
Shmatko's business career from 1992 involved stints consulting in Germany and Russia, and working at the All-Russia Bank of Regional Development. He was appointed head of economic strategy at Rosenergoatom in 1997 and in 2005 became president of Russia's nuclear-power export monopoly, Atomstroyexport.

Minister of Energy
Shmatko was appointed to the newly established position of Minister of Energy in May 2008, during the incoming administration of President Dmitry Medvedev.

Death
He died from COVID-19 on 7 November 2021, during the COVID-19 pandemic in Russia.

References

1966 births
2021 deaths
Russian energy industry businesspeople
Ural State University alumni
University of Marburg alumni
Energy ministers of Russia
United Russia politicians
People from Stavropol
Deaths from the COVID-19 pandemic in Russia